The 1996–97 season was Burnley's 2nd successive season in the third tier of English football. They were managed by Adrian Heath in his only full season since he replaced Jimmy Mullen in March 1996.

Appearances and goals

|}

Transfers

In

Out

Matches

Second Division

Final league position

League Cup

1st Round First Leg
 (384 away)

1st Round Second Leg

2nd Round First Leg

2nd Round Second Leg

FA Cup

1st round

2nd round

2nd Round Replay

3rd round
 (7,000 away)

Football League Trophy

Northern Section 1st Round

Northern Section 2nd Round

References

1996-97
Burnley